Give And Take is the fourth album from The Dynamic Superiors, and their last on Motown Records.  Released in 1977, it includes covers of Martha and the Vandellas' "Nowhere to Run" and Stevie Wonder's "All In Love Is Fair".  It is also noted that singer Mariah Carey sampled the song "Here Comes That Feeling Again" for a song she recorded called "I Feel It" (co-produced by Mahogany) which was intended to be released on her album The Emancipation of Mimi, but was denied clearance for the use of the song by the songwriters (It was leaked out to the internet later, but still remains officially unreleased).

On May 22, 2012, The Dynamic Superiors' Give And Take album was released on CD, not by Motown, but by Universal Records' "Soulmusic Records" imprint.

Track listing
 "Happy Song" (Reginald Brown, Richard Davis, Stafford Floyd)	6:07
 "Give It All Up" (Brian Holland, Edward Holland, Jr., Janie Bradford)	3:51
 "Nowhere to Run" (Holland-Dozier-Holland)	9:07
 "You're What I Need" (Reginald Brown, Richard Davis, Stafford Floyd)	4:47
 "All In Love Is Fair" (Stevie Wonder) 4:31
 "All You Can Do With Love" (Brian Holland, Edward Holland, Jr., Harold Beatty)	3:33
 "Here Comes That Feeling Again" (Brian Holland, Edward Holland, Jr., Harold Beatty, Marlon Woods)	4:22
 "Once Is Just Not Enough" (Edward Holland, Jr., Marlon Woods, Reginald Brown, Stafford Floyd)	5:03

Personnel
Ben Benay, Jay Graydon, Ray Parker Jr. - guitar
Henry Davis, Scott Edwards, Tony Newton - bass
John Barnes, Sylvester Rivers - keyboards
James Gadson - drums
Bob Zimmitti, Gary Coleman, Jules Wechter - percussion
Bobbye Hall Porter - congas
Gene Page, McKinley Jackson - arrangements
Howard Deshong - photography

References

1977 albums
Dynamic Superiors albums
Motown albums
Albums arranged by Gene Page
Albums produced by Edward Holland Jr.
Albums produced by Brian Holland